Seymour Paul Lachman (born December 12, 1933) is an American university professor, political historian, book author, and politician from New York.

Life
Seymour P. Lachman was born on December 12, 1933. He graduated B.A. in 1955, and M.A. in 1958, both in history from Brooklyn College; and Ph.D. in history from New York University in 1963.

Lachman entered politics as a Democrat. He was a member of the New York City Board of Education from 1969 to 1974, and was President of the board from 1973 to 1974. He resigned from the board to spend more time teaching at City University of New York.

Dr. Lachman was a Professor of History and Political Science at Kingsborough Community College of CUNY beginning in 1963, serving as Dean of the Mid-Brooklyn campus beginning in Fall 1965.

On February 15, 1996, he was elected to the  New York State Senate, to fill the vacancy caused by the election of Martin M. Solomon to the New York City Civil Court. He was re-elected four times and remained in the State Senate until 2004, sitting in the 191st, 192nd, 193rd, 194th and 195th New York State Legislatures. He was Deputy Minority Whip from 2003 to 2004.

Afterwards he taught at Adelphi University. In 2008, upon its foundation, he became the Director of the Hugh L. Carey Institute for Government Reform at Wagner College.

Books
 Black/white/green/red: The Politics of Education in Ethnic America   (1978) with David Bresnick and Murray Polner
 One Nation Under God: Religion in Contemporary American Society  (1993) with Barry Kosmin
 Three Men in a Room: The Inside Story of Power and Betrayal in an American Statehouse (2006) with Newsday journalist Robert Polner
 The Man Who Saved New York: Hugh L. Carey and the Great Fiscal Crisis of 1975 co-authored by Robert Polner(2011)
 Mr. New York: Lew Rudin and His Love for the City (2014)
 Failed State: Dysfunction and Corruption in an American Statehouse (2017) with Newsday journalist Robert Polner

References

1933 births
Living people
Politicians from Brooklyn
Democratic Party New York (state) state senators
City University of New York faculty
Adelphi University faculty
Brooklyn College alumni
New York University alumni